

Overview 
Valerio Pascucci (born May 13, 1967 in Rome, Italy) is an Italian computer scientist. He is the John R. Parks Inaugural Endowed Chair of the University of Utah, and the Founding Director of the Center for Extreme Data Management Analysis and Visualization (CEDMAV). Valerio is a faculty of the Scientific Computing and Imaging Institute (SCI), a Professor of Computer Science of the School of Computing  of the University of Utah, and was named Laboratory Fellow at PNNL. His research interests are in the areas of scientific visualization, High Performance Computing, large scale scientific data management, and  Computational Topology.

Biography 
 
Valerio received his MS in Electrical Engineering in 1993 from the Sapienza University of Rome, and his Ph.D. in Computer Science in 2000 from Purdue University.

From 2000-2008, Valerio was a Computer Scientist, Project Leader, and Data Analysis Group Leader of the Center for Applied Scientific Computing at Lawrence Livermore National Laboratory. From 2005-2008, Valerio was an Adjunct Professor of Computer Science at the University of California Davis.
In 2008, Valerio joined the University of Utah, as an Associate Professor of Computer Science. In 2011 he was promoted to the rank of Professor of the University of Utah School of Computing and founded the Center for Extreme Data Management Analysis and Visualization.
In 2011,  Valerio was named DOE Laboratory Fellow at the Pacific Northwest National Laboratory.

In 2020 Valerio was General Chair of the IEEE Conference on Visualization, the world premier forum for advances in visualization and visual analytics.

Outside of his academic activities, Valerio is the Founder and Chair of the Board of the Data Intensive Science Foundation, a non-profit established in 2019, devoted to promoting advanced technologies for science and engineering while providing outreach and training support for the betterment of society. Valerio is also the Founding President of ViSOAR L.L.C., a spinoff of the University of Utah established in 2011.

Selected publications

Selected publications

References 

Italian computer scientists
1967 births
Living people